Puerto Rico competed at the 2002 Winter Olympics in Salt Lake City, United States.

Bobsleigh

The Bobsleigh team did not compete as one athlete (Michael Gonzales) did not meet Puerto Rico Olympic Committee rules about eligibility. After this, the Puerto Rico Olympic Committee withdrew the recognition of the Winter Sports Federation for the island, effectively ending any hopes for athletes competing at the Winter Olympics.

Men

References

Official Olympic Reports

Nations at the 2002 Winter Olympics
2002 Winter Olympics
O